The second season of the American comedy television series Gilligan's Island commenced airing in the United States on September 16, 1965, and concluded on April 28, 1966, on CBS. The second season continues the comic adventures of seven castaways as they attempt to survive and escape from an island on which they had been shipwrecked. Most episodes revolve around the dissimilar castaways' conflicts and their failed attempts—invariably Gilligan's fault—to escape their plight. The season originally aired on Thursdays at 8:00-8:30 pm (EST). Unlike the first season, this season was shot in color.

Production 
Executive producers for the second season of Gilligan's Island included William Froug and series creator Sherwood Schwartz. Filming of the season took place at the CBS Radford Studios complex in Studio City, Los Angeles, California. This complex contained 17 sound stages, as well as special effects and prop departments. On one part of the studio lot, a lagoon had been constructed by the production company "at great expense". According to Bob Denver, the crew would spend half of their days filming scenes in the lagoon. Scenes involving the castaways' huts and or the jungle, were shot on a soundstage. After the series' cancellation, the show's lagoon was not dismantled, and it remained in place until 1995, when it was converted into a parking lot.

Cast 
The series employed an ensemble cast of seven main actors and actresses. Denver played the role of the titular First Mate Gilligan, a bumbling, naive, and accident-prone crewman who often messes up the castaways chances of rescue. Alan Hale Jr. portrayed The Skipper, captain of the S.S. Minnow and the older friend of Gilligan. Jim Backus appeared as Thurston Howell III, a millionaire, and Natalie Schafer played his wife, Eunice Lovelle Wentworth Howell. Tina Louise played the role Ginger Grant, a famous movie star. Russell Johnson portrayed Professor Roy Hinkley, Ph.D., a high school science teacher who often uses his scientific background to try to find ways to get the castaways off the island. Dawn Wells played Mary Ann Summers, wholesome farm girl from Kansas. Charles Maxwell was the uncredited voice of the radio announcer, to whom the castaways would often listen via their radio.

Broadcast history 
The season originally aired Thursdays at 8:00–8:30 pm (EST) on CBS.

DVD release 
The DVD was released by Warner Home Video, with an interdiction by the creator and members of the cast.

Episodes

Footnotes

References 

 
 
 
 
 

Gilligan's Island (season 2)